Pan Wen-chung (born 28 November 1962) is a Taiwanese educator and politician. He first served as Minister of Education from May 2016 to April 2018 and returned to the post in January 2019.

Education
Pan obtained his teaching certificate from Taiwan Provincial Junior Teachers’ College in 1983. He then obtained his bachelor's, master's and doctoral degrees in education from National Taiwan Normal University in 1989, 1993 and 2003 respectively.

Ministry of Education
Pan was named Minister of Education in April 2016, and took office on 20 May. On 13 October 2016, Pan unveiled the Youth Employment Pilot Program at the Executive Yuan to help the low income high school graduates to college or careers in which those qualified will get a NT$5,000 monthly subsidy. He resigned from the education ministry in April 2018, over the controversy regarding the selection of Kuan Chung-ming as president of National Taiwan University. Pan was reappointed education minister in January 2019.

References

Living people
1962 births
Taiwanese Ministers of Education
National Taiwan Normal University alumni
Politicians of the Republic of China on Taiwan from Yilan County, Taiwan
Deputy mayors of Taichung